Julio Mattos (born 30 March 1940) is an Argentine former footballer. He was also part of Argentina's squad for the 1960 Summer Olympics, but he did not play in any matches.

References

1940 births
Living people
Association football defenders
Argentine footballers
Argentinos Juniors footballers